James Richey may refer to:

 Sir James Bellett Richey (1834–1902), British administrator in Bombay Presidency
 James Alexander Richey (1874–1931), British educational administrator in South Africa and India
 James Ernest Richey (1886–1968), Irish-born geologist